Steve Darcis was the defending champion but decided not to participate in The Hague Open - Singles. 
Jerzy Janowicz won the title, defeating Matwé Middelkoop 6–2, 6–2 in the final.

Seeds

Draw

Finals

Top half

Bottom half

References
 Main Draw
 Qualifying Draw

The Hague Open - Singles
2012 Singles